A middle school is a school for students older than elementary school, but not yet in high school. This is a list of public middle schools in Florida serving grades six through eight and does not include schools of online education and private schools. A list of private schools by county can be found here.

Alachua County

Baker County

Bay County

Bradford County

Brevard County

Broward County

Calhoun County

Charlotte County

Citrus County

Clay County
Clay County has Junior High Schools listed here.

Collier County

Columbia County

DeSoto County

Dixie County

Duval County

Escambia County

Flagler County

Franklin County

Gadsden County

Gilchrist County

Glades County

Gulf County

Hamilton County

Hardee County

Hendry County

Hernando County

Highlands County

Hillsborough County

Holmes County

Indian River County

Jackson County

Jefferson County

Lafayette County

Lake County

Lee County

Leon County

Levy County

Liberty County

Madison County

Manatee County

Marion County

Martin County

Miami-Dade County

Monroe County

Nassau County

Okaloosa County

Okeechobee County

Orange County

Osceola County

Palm Beach County

Pinellas County

Polk County

Putnam County

St. Johns County

St. Lucie County

Santa Rosa County

Sarasota County

Seminole County

Sumter County

Suwannee County

Taylor County

Union County

Volusia County

Wakulla County

Walton County

Washington County

References

See also
List of school districts in Florida
List of high schools in Florida

Middle
Florida